Gracie Elvin (born 31 October 1988) is an Australian former racing cyclist, who rode professionally between 2012 and 2020, for the  and . Elvin is a two-time winner of the Australian National Road Race Championships, with victories in 2013 and 2014, and the first Australian rider to record a podium finish at the Tour of Flanders for Women, with second in 2017.

Career
She competed in the 2013 UCI women's road race in Florence. After missing the 2014 UCI Road World Championships, Elvin competed in the women's road race in 2015, 2016 and 2017. Elvin has also represented Australia at the 2014 Commonwealth Games in Glasgow, and the 2018 Commonwealth Games on home soil in the Gold Coast; she also competed in the road race at the 2016 Summer Olympics for Australia.

In October 2020, Elvin announced that she would retire at the end of the 2020 season.

Elvin is also the Communications Director of The Cyclists' Alliance.

Gracie Elvin, and  Matthew Keenan co-hosted the Seven Network broadcast of the 2023 Santos Women’s Tour Down Under used by  Peacock in the US.

Major results

2006
 2nd Cross-country, National Junior Mountain Bike Championships
2007
 3rd Cross-country, National Under-23 Mountain Bike Championships
2008
 2nd Cross-country, National Under-23 Mountain Bike Championships
2009
 1st  Cross-country, National Under-23 Mountain Bike Championships
2012
 Oceania Road Cycling Championships
1st  Road race
2nd  Time trial
 2nd EPZ Omloop van Borsele
 6th Gooik–Geraardsbergen–Gooik
 8th 7-Dorpenomloop Aalburg
2013
 National Road Championships
1st  Road race
3rd Criterium
 4th Overall Ladies Tour of Qatar
 6th Overall Energiewacht Tour
2014
 1st  Road race, National Road Championships
 6th Road race, Commonwealth Games
 7th EPZ Omloop van Borsele
 9th Overall Energiewacht Tour
2015
 1st Gooik–Geraardsbergen–Gooik
 1st Stage 3b Thüringen Rundfahrt der Frauen
 5th Overall Bay Classic Series
1st Stage 2
 6th Cadel Evans Great Ocean Road Race
 10th Overall Ladies Tour of Qatar
2016
 1st Gooik–Geraardsbergen–Gooik
 2nd Ronde van Drenthe
 5th Overall Ladies Tour of Qatar
 7th Overall Energiewacht Tour
 7th Acht van Westerveld
 9th Overall The Women's Tour
2017
 2nd Dwars door Vlaanderen
 2nd Tour of Flanders for Women
 8th Drentse Acht van Westerveld
 9th Gooik–Geraardsbergen–Gooik
 10th Cadel Evans Great Ocean Road Race
 10th Omloop Het Nieuwsblad
2018
 2nd Cadel Evans Great Ocean Road Race
 2nd Gooik–Geraardsbergen–Gooik
 2nd Team time trial, Ladies Tour of Norway
2019
 2nd Time trial, National Road Championships
 4th La Classique Morbihan
 5th Omloop van het Hageland
 5th Drentse Acht van Westerveld
2020
 3rd Criterium, National Road Championships

See also
 2014 Orica-AIS season

References

External links
 
 

1988 births
Living people
Australian female cyclists
Olympic cyclists of Australia
Cyclists at the 2016 Summer Olympics
Commonwealth Games competitors for Australia
Cyclists at the 2014 Commonwealth Games
ACT Academy of Sport alumni
Cyclists from the Australian Capital Territory
Sportspeople from Canberra
20th-century Australian women
21st-century Australian women